Ziziphin, a triterpene glycoside which exhibits taste-modifying properties, has been isolated from the leaves of Ziziphus jujuba (Rhamnaceae).

Among ziziphin's known homologues found in this plant, it is the most anti-sweet. However, its anti-sweet activity is less effective than gymnemic acid 1, another anti-sweet compound glycoside isolated from the leaves of Gymnema sylvestre (Asclepiadaceae).

Ziziphin reduces perceived sweetness of most of the carbohydrates (e.g. glucose, fructose), bulk sweeteners, intense sweeteners (natural: steviol glycoside – artificial: sodium saccharin and aspartame) and sweet amino acids (e.g. glycine). However, it has no effect on the perception of the other tastes, bitterness, sourness and saltiness.

See also 
 Hodulcine
 Lactisole
 Gymnemic acid

References 

Taste modifiers
Saponins
Triterpene glycosides
Acetate esters